The 2021 Boston mayoral election was held on Tuesday, November 2, 2021, to elect the mayor of Boston, Massachusetts. Incumbent mayor Marty Walsh was eligible to seek a third term. However, he resigned as mayor on March 22, 2021, after being confirmed as Secretary of Labor in the Cabinet of Joe Biden.

Since more than two candidates qualified for the ballot, a non-partisan preliminary election was held on September 14 in order to determine which two candidates would advance to the general election. On the morning of September 15, the counting of ballots reached 100% reporting with Michelle Wu as the first-place winner and Annissa Essaibi George in a second place. As the two top vote-getters, they advanced to face each other in the general election. Wu won the general election on November 2 by 28 points, with her victory making her both the first woman and person of color to be elected as Mayor of Boston.

Logistics

Elimination of a potential special election
In early 2021, incumbent mayor Marty Walsh was expected to resign to take the United States Secretary of Labor position. His date of leaving office would normally determine if the city would be required to hold a special election for the remainder of his term, or if the acting mayor would serve the remainder of his term. The Boston City Charter requires that a special election be held for the office of mayor when a vacancy occurs "within sixteen months after a regular municipal election." As Boston held a municipal election on November 5, 2019, a 16-month window from that election extended until March 5, 2021. Thus, if Walsh had left his position as mayor before then, a special election to fill the remainder of his term would have normally been required, per the city charter.

Ricardo Arroyo of the Boston City Council proposed that the city charter requirement for a special election be overridden; such an override requires approval from Boston's city council and mayor, followed by approval by the state legislature and governor. The city council approved a home rule petition, which would dispense with the special election, on February 3; it was subsequently signed by mayor Walsh. The petition next required approval from the state legislature (where it was filed as HD 1757, "An Act Relative to the Office of the Mayor of the City of Boston") and governor. It passed in the Massachusetts House of Representatives on February 22, the Massachusetts Senate on February 25, and was signed by governor Charlie Baker on February 26, thus eliminating the need for a special election if Walsh vacated his office as mayor before March 5. As Walsh was still in office through that date, with his confirmation pending with the U.S. Senate, any consideration of a special election became moot. Walsh ultimately resigned as mayor on March 22, 2021, the same day that he was confirmed to his cabinet role.

Postal voting
In the summer of 2021, state lawmakers temporarily extended a COVID-19 pandemic-related voting reform allowing voters to request no-excuse mail-in ballots and to return them through either the mail or through ballot drop boxes.

Rescheduling of preliminary election
In late April, the Boston City Council approved moving the date of the preliminary municipal election from September 21 to September 14. The rationale for doing so was that it would grant officials an additional week to distribute mail-in voting ballots ahead of the November general election, since such ballots could not be printed until after the preliminary election determined which candidates would advance to the November general election ballot. The date change ordinance was signed two weeks later by Acting Mayor Kim Janey, making the change official.

Date of swearing-in
Because of the vacancy in office, the city charter stipulates that the winner of the mayoral election will be sworn in as soon as is conveniently possible once the results of the general election are certified. On September 24, 2021, Acting Mayor Kim Janey and general election candidates Annissa Essaibi George and Michelle Wu mutually reached an agreement for November 16 to be the tentative date for the new mayor to be sworn in.

Candidates
To appear on the ballot, candidates were required to file nomination papers at Boston City Hall by 5:00 p.m. on May 18 with 3,000 certified signatures of registered voters. Eight candidates were certified to appear on the ballot in the preliminary election of September 14.

While the election is nonpartisan, all of the major candidates publicly identify as Democrats. All of the major candidates were people of color and four of the major candidates were women (Boston voters had never before elected a woman or a person of color to the city's mayoralty).

Advanced to general election

Eliminated in preliminary election

Robert Cappucci, perennial candidate
Richard Spagnuolo

Did not make ballot
Michael J Bianchi II, candidate for Boston City Council District 9
Joao DePina, businessman
Roy Owens, perennial candidate
Patrick Williams, candidate for Boston City Council at-large and Boston City Council District 3

Withdrew before preliminary election
Dana Depelteau, former hotel manager
Jon Santiago, state representative (endorsed Janey, still appeared on ballot)

Declined
Ricardo Arroyo, Boston city councilor (running for re-election, endorsed Janey, then Wu)
Kenzie Bok, Boston city councilor (running for re-election)
Sonia Chang-Díaz, state senator (running for governor and endorsed Wu)
Nick Collins, State senator
John R. Connolly, at-large member of the Boston City Council (2008-2014); Candidate for Mayor of Boston in the 2013 Boston mayoral election
Karilyn Crockett, former chief of equity for the City of Boston
Linda Dorcena Forry, former state senator
Lydia Edwards, Boston city councilor (running for re-election and State Senate; endorsed Wu)
Nika Elugardo, state representative (endorsed Janey)
Michael F. Flaherty, Boston city councilor at-large and former candidate in the 2009 Boston mayoral election (running for re-election)
Edward M. Flynn, Boston city councilor (running for re-election)
Althea Garrison, former Boston city councilor at-large, state representative, and perennial candidate (running for City Council at-large)
William G. Gross, former Boston Police Commissioner (endorsed Essaibi George)
Russell Holmes, state representative
Segun Idowu, executive director of the Black Economic Council of Massachusetts
Marty Martinez, chief of health and human services for the City of Boston
Julia Mejia, Boston city councilor at-large (running for re-election)
Aaron Michlewitz, state representative (endorsed Santiago, then Wu)
Matt O'Malley, outgoing Boston city councilor and president pro tempore of the Boston City Council
Carmen Ortiz, former United States Attorney for the District of Massachusetts
Rachael Rollins, Suffolk County district attorney
Michael F. Rush, state senator
Tanisha Sullivan, president of the Boston NAACP
Steve Tompkins, Suffolk County sheriff (endorsed Wu)
Marty Walsh, Mayor of Boston from January 2014 until March 22, 2021; resigned upon being confirmed as United States Secretary of Labor

Primary

Campaign
The first two major candidates to enter the race were at-large City Councillor Michelle Wu, followed by District 4 City Councillor Andrea Campbell. Both announced their runs in September 2020, while incumbent Mayor Marty Walsh was still considered a likely candidate for re-election.

On January 7, 2021, President-elect Joe Biden designated Walsh to be his nominee for secretary of labor, changing the dynamics of the race, as if confirmed Walsh would vacate the mayoralty and make the election an open-race. Walsh was ultimately confirmed in March, making Kim Janey acting mayor. Following the announcement of Walsh's nomination city official John Barros, At-large Councillor Annissa Essaibi George, and state representative Jon Santiago announced their candidacies. After becoming acting mayor following Walsh's confirmation, Kim Janey announced her candidacy. Santiago withdrew from the race on 13 July, with CommonWealth Magazine citing poor poll numbers and difficulty in building a field organization as his probable reasons for doing so.

Writing on the primary election race, Ellen Barry of the New York Times called it "a departure" from the norm that the 2021 election has focused primarily on policy, rather than the candidates focusing on winning over particular racial/ethnic groups, remarking, "Boston's campaigns have long turned on ethnic rivalries, first between Anglo-Protestants and Irish Catholics, then drawing in racial minorities as those populations increased." James Pindell of The Boston Globe wrote that some of the top topics debated in the primary were, "public schools, housing, development, policing, climate resiliency, drug usage, and mental health."

Janey's campaign suffered a blow in early August when she expressed opposition to COVID-19 vaccine passports, likening them to slavery and birtherism. Janey's remarks drew criticism from elected officials and her fellow candidates, and caused her to drop in the polls. Campell was particularly assertive in her criticism of Janey's comments, accusing her of endangering public health.

By early September, news sources largely considered Wu to have established herself in polls as the primary election's front-runner, with Andrea Campbell, Annissa Essaibi George, and Kim Janey being seeing as hotly contesting for a second-place finish. Wu's campaign was boosted by a collection of young internet activists who had vigorously supported her, referred to as the "Markeyverse" due to their support for Senator Ed Markey in his re-election campaign the previous year.

Debates

Endorsements

Polling
Graphical summary

Campaign finances
The following table lists the campaign fundraising and spending totals for each candidates from the dates they each formally launched their campaigns, through the day of the September 14, 2021 primary. Candidates are, by default, sorted in the table in the order of their total funds raised since launching their campaigns, from greatest (at top) to least (at bottom).

Independent expenditures
The following table lists reported independent expenditures made in support or opposition to each candidate from the start of September 2020, through the day of the September 14, 2021 primary. Candidates are listed by default by the total of independent expenditures made in support of them, from greatest (at top) to least (at bottom).

Results
There were reportedly twice the number of postal votes cast than election officials had anticipated. In a statement by the Boston Election Department, an hours-long delay on election night in reporting substantial results was blamed on the need to cross-reference the roughly 7,000 postal votes cast by mail or drop-box with the voter rolls. On Twitter, Massachusetts secretary of the commonwealth William F. Galvin's office also laid the blame on drop boxes. With only a small fraction of the vote reported, Janey and Campbell conceded, and Wu and Essaibi George both gave victory speeches. Both Wu and Essaibi George had support from distinct geographical bases, with Essaibi George's margins largely coming from the more conservative areas of South Boston and Dorchester, while Wu's strongest areas were East Boston, Jamaica Plain and Roslindale. Janey won strong support from Boston's African-American community and carried Hyde Park, while Campbell largely ran second in both African-American and more left-wing wards.

Janey's defeat made her the first incumbent of any kind since 1949 to lose a Boston mayoral election.

General election

Campaign

2021 marked the first time in Boston's history that both candidates in the general election identified as people of color. It also marked the first time that both were women. Wu was regarded to be a progressive, while Essaibi George was thought of as a moderate.

Wu was endorsed for the general election by eliminated candidate Kim Janey. The neighborhood of Hyde Park was considered a potential battleground in the election, due to it being home to a substantial voter base that had not backed either Wu or Essaibi George in the preliminary.

At the start of the general election campaign, Joe Battenfield of the Boston Herald described Wu as the general election's "presumptive front-runner." William Forry and Gintautas Dumcius of the Dorchester Reporter also opined that Wu was the leading candidate. By early October, there was a wide perception of Wu being the leading candidate in the race. At that time, Meghan E. Irons and Emma Platoff of The Boston Globe opined that the developments of the general election campaign had largely been falling in Wu's favor, particularly pointing to endorsements which Wu had received. Writing again in mid-October, Battenfield characterized Wu's campaign as "coasting on a front-runner campaign strategy".

Debates

Endorsements
Endorsements in bold were made after the preliminary election.

Polling
Graphical summary

Andrea Campbell vs. Michelle Wu

Kim Janey vs. Michelle Wu

Campaign finances
The following table lists the campaign fundraising and spending totals for each candidates following the end of the primary election through the election, the period of September 15, 2021 through November 2, 2021. The candidates are, by default, sorted in the table in the order of their total funds raised, from greatest (at top) to least (at bottom).

Independent expenditures
The following table lists reported independent expenditures made in support or opposition to each candidate between September 15, 2021 and November 2, 2021. Candidates are listed by default by the total of independent expenditures made in support of them, from greatest (at top) to least (at bottom).

Results

Notes

Partisan clients

See also
List of mayors of Boston, Massachusetts

References

Further reading

External links
 Bill HD.1757 "An Act relative to the office of Mayor in the city of Boston" via MAlegislature.gov

Official campaign websites
 John Barros (D) for Mayor 
 Andrea Campbell (D) for Mayor
 Robert Cappucci for Mayor
 Annissa Essaibi George (D) for Mayor
 Kim Janey (D) for Mayor 
 Jon Santiago (D) for Mayor
 Michelle Wu (D) for Mayor

Mayoral election
Boston mayoral
Boston
Mayoral elections in Boston
Non-partisan elections
Boston mayoral election